The flag of Washington consists of the state seal, displaying an image of its namesake George Washington, on a field of dark green with gold fringe being optional. It is the only U.S. state flag with a field of green as well as the only state flag with the image of an American president. The secretary of state regulates flag protocol related to the state flag, as well approving replica flags for commercial sale and other standards related to the flag.

The flag was officially adopted on March 5, 1923, and has been a symbol of Washington ever since. Washington had achieved statehood in 1889, but did not have an official flag at the time. The Washington chapter of the Daughters of the American Revolution designed the flag in 1915 and campaigned for its adoption by the Washington State Legislature in the early 1920s. The state flag has undergone minor revisions since its adoption, including the use of standardized colors in 1955 and a modernized seal in 1967.

History

Washington adopted its seal during the state constitutional convention on August 21, 1889, months prior to official admission as a U.S. state on November 11, 1889. While the new state did not have an official flag, a military flag displaying a gold profile of George Washington, the state's namesake, on blue bunting was used across the state at the turn of the 20th century and was first carried by the Washington Volunteer Infantry during the Philippine–American War in 1899. Another popular design was a purple or green flag bearing the state seal in gold.

In 1913, representative William J. Hughes of Whatcom County proposed the formation of a commission to adopt the state flag, consisting of the governor, secretary of state, and adjutant general. Governor Ernest Lister became a supporter of the idea, issuing a call for designs from the state's citizens and city organizations. The campaign for a state flag, however, was opposed by patriotic groups like the Sons of the American Revolution and Sons of Veterans, finding the use of a state flag to be detrimental to the national flag. Hughes' bill was passed 69–20 in the state House of Representatives, but did not make it to the floor in the state senate.

The Washington chapter of the Daughters of the American Revolution (DAR) began a campaign to adopt an official state flag during the Alaska–Yukon–Pacific Exposition of 1909, a world's fair hosted in Seattle. In 1914, the national DAR requested that the Washington chapter send a state flag to be displayed in the DAR Memorial Continental Hall in Washington, D.C. Upon discovering that the state lacked a suitable flag, the DAR formed a design committee, led by Emma Chadwick (wife of Washington Supreme Court justice Stephen J. Chadwick), to design a state flag. The DAR's flag, adopted in 1915, consisted of a green background with the state seal in the center. The flag was manufactured in Washington, D.C., at a cost of $48, and displayed by the national DAR until 1916. The flag was returned to the Washington chapter for their April 1916 general meeting in Everett, where DAR State Regent Elizabeth Bowden called on the chapter to ask the legislature to accept the flag as an official state symbol.

A 1917 issue of National Geographic Magazine on U.S. state flags featured an unofficial flag of Washington similar to the DAR's design, a green background and the state seal in gold, sourced from "military authorities". Another major flag proposal merged in 1920 from the short-lived Washington State Nautical School, where secretary-treasurer Grover C. Gaier designed a green flag with the state seal and fringe in gold.

The DAR renewed its lobbying for a state flag in 1922, having gained the approval of the Sons of the American Revolution and other civic organizations. A bill adopting the state flag was introduced in the 1923 legislative session and passed unanimously in the Senate by February, and the House of Representatives on March 5, 1923. The governor's approval was not required and the bill became law, formally adopting the state flag. The law took effect on June 7, 1923, and an unofficial flag was unfurled on Flag Day by the DAR. At the time of its adoption, Washington was one of four states lacking an official state flag. The first official state flag, manufactured by Willis Bloom of the secretary of state's office, was unveiled on July 23, 1924. The new flag was celebrated with a "State Flag Waltz" performed at the Inaugural Ball on January 15, 1925, following the inauguration of Governor Roland H. Hartley.

During the 1925–26 session, the state legislature approved a change to the state flag that replaced the green fringe with a gold to match the state seal. The gold-fringed flag made its official debut on June 27, 1927, flying on the official automobile of the governor during a tour of Fort Lewis. In 1929, the DAR presented a state flag to Governor Hartley, who received it on behalf of the state for display in the Washington State Capitol.

The Washington Secretary of State issued standardized colors for the state flag in 1955, including the modern colors used in the state seal. The state seal itself was redesigned by Dick Nelms at the request of the secretary of state in 1967, using Gilbert Stuart's famous portrait painting of George Washington. The new state seal was approved by the state legislature in April 1967, placing it on the updated state flag with immediate effect.

In 2001, the North American Vexillological Association surveyed its members and other flag enthusiasts on the designs of the 72 U.S. state, U.S. territorial, and Canadian provincial flags. Members ranked the Washington state flag 47th out of the 72 flags surveyed, with a score of 4.53 points out of 10. Washington's flag was criticized for its complicated seal, use of lettering, and similarities to other U.S. state flags that used seals on solid colors.

Design

The flag of Washington consists of a dark green field with the seal of Washington, a portrait of George Washington inside a ring with the words "The Seal of the State of Washington 1889", in the center. The flag may also have an optional gold fringe. It is the only U.S. state flag to feature a green background, as well as the only one to feature the likeness of an identifiable historic person. The size of the seal is proportional to the length of the flag, with a ratio of 1:3 between the seal diameter and length of the flag.

The flag's colors follow both the Standard Color Reference of America, and  the Pantone Matching System. According to Senator Guy B. Groff, sponsor of the 1923 bill that adopted the flag, the flag's green field represented the "verdant fields" of Western Washington, while the gold seal represented the "wheat areas" of Eastern Washington.

Usage and protocol

The Washington Secretary of State regulates flag protocol as well as the distribution and sale of the state flag. Replica flags made for commercial sale are required to be approved by the secretary of state. The state seal on the flag must be stitched on both sides with the profile of George Washington facing the same direction, making the Washington state flag among the most expensive U.S. state flags to manufacture.

When flown within the state of Washington, the state flag occupies the highest position of honor after the U.S. flag and the flags of other sovereign nations. When flown alongside other U.S. state flags, the Washington state flag is placed 42nd, the order in which it ratified the U.S. Constitution and became a state. A section of the Revised Code of Washington also requires that the state flag and the U.S. flag "shall be prominently installed, displayed and maintained in schools, court rooms and state buildings." The state flag and U.S. flag are also required to be prominently displayed by code cities and displayed on certain holidays by all cities, towns, and counties.

The lowering of the state and U.S. flags to half-mast is left at the discretion of local entities, but may be ordered by the Governor of Washington during the observance of memorial days, as well as in the event of the death of prominent government officials, state employees, public safety servants in the line of duty, and members of the United States Armed Forces from Washington.

References

External links

Washington Secretary of State - State Flag
Flags of the World: Washington

 
Symbols of Washington (state)
Washington
George Washington in art